Yineisy Paola Reyes Marinez (born ) is a Dominican Republic female weightlifter, competing in the 58 kg category and representing Dominican Republic at international competitions. 

She competed at the 2010 Summer Youth Olympics.
She competed at world championships, most recently at the 2014 World Weightlifting Championships.

Major results

References

External links

1993 births
Living people
Dominican Republic female weightlifters
Place of birth missing (living people)
Weightlifters at the 2010 Summer Youth Olympics
Weightlifters at the 2011 Pan American Games
Weightlifters at the 2015 Pan American Games
Pan American Games competitors for the Dominican Republic
20th-century Dominican Republic women
21st-century Dominican Republic women